Albert Abernathy "Buz" Phillips (May 25, 1904 – November 6, 1964) was a Major League Baseball pitcher who played for the Philadelphia Phillies in .

External links

1904 births
1964 deaths
Baseball players from North Carolina
Catawba Indians baseball players
Lenoir–Rhyne Bears baseball players
Major League Baseball pitchers
Philadelphia Phillies players
People from Newton, North Carolina
Newton-Conover Twins players